Kuno is an Estonian and German male given name.

People named Kuno include:
Kuno II von Falkenstein (1320–1388), Archbishop of Trier
Kuno Becker (born 1978), Mexican actor
Kuno-Hans von Both (1884–1955), German military commander
Kuno Fischer (1824–1907), German philosopher and historian
Kuno Francke (1855–1930), German-American historian
Kuno Goda, German artist
Kuno Gonschior (1933–2010), German painter
Kuno Klötzer (1922–2011), German football coach
Kuno von Klebelsberg (1875–1932), Hungarian politician
Kuno Lorenz (born 1932), German philosopher
Kuno Meyer (1858–1919), German linguist
Kuno von Meyer (1913–2010), German military commander
Kuno von Moltke (1847–1923), German military commander
Kuno Pajula (1924–2012), Estonian clergyman
Kuno Thomasson (1923–2007), Estonian-Swedish phycologist, hydrobiologist and ecologist
Kuno Todeson (1924–2022), Estonian politician
Kuno Veeber (1898–1929), Estonian painter
Kuno von Westarp (1864–1945), German politician

References

Estonian masculine given names
German masculine given names